Save Bessarabia Union (USB), previously known as European Action Movement is a political party from Moldova. The party supportes the unification of Romania and Moldova. On 21 July 2019, the party changed its name from European Action Movement to Save Bessarabia Union and elected Valeriu Munteanu as its new president.

Overview 

The party was formed at the first congress on October 22, 2006. The first president was Anatol Petrencu (October 22, 2006 – January 24, 2010). It merged into the Liberal Party (PL) in March, 2011. Valeriu Munteanu has been the president of the party since July 21, 2019. According to its statute, Save Bessarabia Union's main political objective focuses on the Unification of Romania and Moldova. USB's doctrine will be based on three fundamental pillars:

 identity (ethno-lignuistic affiliation to the Romanian Nation);
 family (traditional family);
 allegiance (Christian orthodox allegiance).

The USB is one of the founding members of Mișcarea Politică Unirea (MPU), a political party established for the unification of Romania and Moldova.

Notable former members 

 Anatol Petrencu 
 Veaceslav Untilă 
 Iurie Colesnic

Electoral results

Legislative elections

Bibliography 
 Statutul MAE 
 Echipa şi platforma electorală

References

External links
Save Bessarabia Union official site.
 Anatol Petrenco - site personal

Christian democratic parties in Europe
Political parties established in 2006
Romanian nationalism in Moldova